Jean-Marie Villot (11 October 1905 – 9 March 1979) was a French prelate and Cardinal of the Roman Catholic Church who served as Archbishop of Lyon from 1965 to 1967, Prefect of the Congregation for the Clergy from 1967 to 1969, Vatican Secretary of State from 1969 to 1979, and Camerlengo of the Holy Roman Church from 1970 to 1979. He was made a cardinal in 1965.

Early life
He was born on 11 October 1905 in Saint-Amant-Tallende, Puy-de-Dôme, to Joseph and Marie (née Laville) Villot; he was an only child. Before serving in the military until 2 August 1924, he studied for the priesthood in Riom, Clermont, and Lyon. He became a Marist novice on 7 September 1925, but left the order three months later. He then studied at the Catholic Institute of Paris and the Pontifical Athenaeum Angelicum in Rome, where he earned a licentiate in canon law and a doctorate in sacred theology in 1934 with a thesis entitled Le pape Nicolas II et le décret de 1059 sur l'élection pontificale.

Priesthood
He was ordained a priest of the Archdiocese of Paris on 19 April 1930 by Archbishop Alfred-Henri-Marie Baudrillart, rector of the Institut Catholique. From 1931 to 1934, he served as secretary to Pierre-Marie Gerlier, Bishop of Tarbes-et-Lourdes. He taught at the Clermont seminary and the Catholic University in Lyon, serving as vice-rector of the latter from 1942 to 1950. At the start of 1950 he was incardinated into the Archdiocese of Lyon.

Bishop

Pope Pius XII appointed Villot auxiliary bishop of Paris and titular bishop of Vinda on 2 September 1954. He received his episcopal consecration on 12 October from Cardinal Maurice Feltin, with Archbishop Emile Guerry
of Cambrai and Bishop Pierre de la Chanonie of Clermont as co-consecrators.

On 17 December 1959, he was named Coadjutor Archbishop of Lyon and titular archbishop of Bosporus. He succeeded Cardinal Gerlier as Archbishop of Lyon on 17 January 1965.

During the Second Vatican Council, he served as one of several of the council's undersecretaries, where his performance impressed Pope Paul.

Cardinal

On 22 February 1965, he was created Cardinal-Priest of SS. Trinità al Monte Pincio by Pope Paul VI.

He was named Prefect of the Congregation of the Council (later renamed the Congregation for the Clergy) on 7 April 1967. Two years later, on 2 May 1969, he was named Cardinal Secretary of State as part of Pope Paul's program to internationalize the Roman Curia. Though Villot told reporters "I have long been a Roman at heart", his appointment was resented by the Italians though without public conflict. Pope Paul underscored his stance by adding to Villot's portfolio in May 1969, naming him head of the Section if the Secretariat of State responsible for foreign affairs, expanding his control over broader curia by making him President of the Pontifical Commission for Vatican City State and of the Administration of the Patrimony of the Apostolic See.

Villot was named Camerlengo of the Holy Roman Church on 16 October 1970, the first non-Italian to hold the office in half a millennium, a further testament of Pope Paul's insistence on expanding the role of non-Italians at the highest levels of the Vatican bureaucracy. On 15 July 1971, he was appointed President of the newly formed Pontifical Council Cor Unum, a position he resigned on 4 September 1978, during the brief pontificate of Pope John Paul I.

Pope Paul elevated him to Cardinal Bishop of Frascati on 12 December 1974. Villot was present at the death of Paul VI in Castel Gandolfo on 6 August 1978.

Pope John Paul I retained Villot as Secretary of State. When Pope John Paul II announced he would retain Villot as Secretary of State, he made clear the appointment was short-term but also confirmed Villot in his other positions. He noted that Villot himself had suggested that the first non-Italian pope in centuries might want an Italian as his Secretary of State. He was replaced as Secretary of State on 1 July 1979, nearly four months after his death in office.

Villot participated as a cardinal elector in both the August and October conclaves of 1978, which elected John Paul I and John Paul II respectively, and presided at the conclaves because he was the senior cardinal bishop in attendance. As Camerlengo he acted as the interim administrator of the Holy See in the interregnums of 1978.

Death
Villot died at age 73 from bronchial pneumonia on 9 March 1979, in his Vatican City apartment, the day he returned from a four-day hospital stay. John Paul II celebrated his funeral Mass in St. Peter's Basilica on 13 March,  and his remains were buried in the crypt of Ss. Trinità al Monte Pincio.

References

Bibliography
 Wenger, Antoine, Le cardinal Jean Villot 1905-1979: Secretaire d'état de trois papes, Desclée de Brouwere, Paris, 1989

External links
Catholic Hierarchy: Jean-Marie Cardinal Villot

1905 births
1979 deaths
Presidents of the Pontifical Commission for Vatican City State
20th-century French cardinals
Cardinal-bishops of Frascati
Participants in the Second Vatican Council
Diplomats of the Holy See
Archbishops of Lyon
Deaths from pneumonia in Vatican City
Deaths from bronchopneumonia
Cardinal Secretaries of State
Prefects of the Congregation for the Clergy
Pontifical Council Cor Unum
Administration of the Patrimony of the Apostolic See
Camerlengos of the Holy Roman Church
Cardinals created by Pope Paul VI
Pontifical University of Saint Thomas Aquinas alumni
People from Puy-de-Dôme